This is a list of ski jumping hills passing the FIS rules, to be competition hills in Ski Jumping Fis-Cup, Continental Cup and World Cup. It also includes hills passing the rules for a national championship.

Austria

Over 150 
 Tauplitz/Bad Mitterndorf (World Cup) 235 | 200

100-150 
 Bergisel, Innsbruck (World Cup and Four Hills) 128 | 120
 Bischofshofen (World Cup and Four Hills) 142 | 125 
 Eisenerz 100 | 90
 Felix Gottwald Ski Jumping Stadium, Saalfelden 85 | 60 | 30 | 15
 Hinzenbach 110/90
 Ramsau am Dachstein 98 | 90
 Saalfelden 98 | 90
 Seefeld 100 | 90
 Stams 115 | 105

Bosnia and Herzegovina 
 Igman Olympic Jumps, mountain of Igman in Ilidža (1984 Winter Olympics), Sarajevo

Bulgaria 
 Chernia kos in Samokov is the only OK hill in Bulgaria, but there was a K-90 in Borovets and a K-15 in Kostenets.

Canada 
Big Thunder Ski Jumping Center (closed - 1996), Thunder Bay, Ontario (WCH 1995 / World Cup), K-120, K-90, K-64, K-37, K-20, K-10
 Canada Olympic Park (closed 2019), Calgary, Alberta (1988 Winter Olympics), K-114 (not operational), K-89, K-63, K-38, K-18, K-10
 Nels Nelsen Hill (closed), Revelstoke, British Columbia, K-80, K-60 
 Red Deer Canyons Ski Resort, K-45
Whistler Olympic Park, Whistler, British Columbia (2010 Winter Olympics / World Cup), K-120, K-90

Czech Republic

Over 150 
 Harrachov (World Cup) 142 | 125, 210 | 185

100-150 
 Liberec (World Cup) 134 | 120, K-90
 Frenstat K-95

Estonia
 Otepää (Continental Cup) K90 | K40 | K25 | K15 | K10

Finland
 Kuopio (World Cup) 127 | 120
 Kuusamo (World Cup) 142 | 120
 Lahti (World Cup) 130 | 116
 Rovaniemi 100 | 90
 Vuokatti (Continental Cup, Fis Cup) 102 | 90

France 
 Chaux-Neuve (Continental Cup) 100 | 90
 Courchevel (Summer Grand Prix) 135 | 125

Germany

Over 150 
 Oberstdorf (World Cup and Four Hills) (normal, large and ski flying hills) 137 | 120, 100 | 90, 235 | 200

100-150 
 Berchtesgaden (Fis Cup) 98 | 90
 Brotterode (Continental Cup, Fis-Cup) 117 | 105
 Garmisch-Partenkirchen (World Cup and Four Hills) 140 | 125
 Hinterzarten (Summer Grand Prix) 108 | 95
 Klingenthal (World Cup) 140 | 125
 Lauscha (Continental Cup) 102 | 92
 Oberhof (World Cup Nordic Combined) 140 | 120
 Oberwiesenthal (Continental Cup, Fis-Cup) 106 | 95
 Ruhpolding (World Cup Nordic Combined) 128 | 115
 Schonach (Continental Cup) 96 | 90
 Titisee-Neustadt (World Cup) 142 | 125
 Willingen (World Cup) 147 | 130

Under 100 
 Braunlage (Continental Cup) 90

Italy 
 Claviere (Universiade 1966)
 Dobbiaco/Toblach (Women Continental Cup 2005–2009)
 Gallio
 Pellizzano
 Pragelato (Olympics 2006, World Cup) 140 | 125
 Predazzo (Nordic WM 1991, 2003, 2013; World Cup Nordic Combined; Universiade 2013) 135 | 120
 Santa Cristina Valgardena
 Tarvisio (Universiade 1985, Junior WM 2007) 100 | 90

Abandoned / Destroyed
 Asiago
 Bardonecchia
 Bolzano
 Cesuna di Roana
 Cortina (Olympics 1956) 92 | 85
 Ponte di Legno
 Mottarone
 Roccaraso
 Sestriere

Japan
 Hakuba 131 | 120
 Okuyarama, Sapporo (World Cup) 137 | 123
 Mount Zaō 102/95

Kazakhstan
 Sunkar International Ski Jumping Complex in Almaty (World Cup, Continental Cup) 140 | 125

Norway

Over 150 
 Vikersund (World Cup, Continental Cup and FIS Cup) (normal and flying hill) 100 | 90, 240 | 200

100-150 
 Lillehammer (World Cup) 138 | 123
 Notodden (Fis-Cup) 100 | 90
 Oslo (World Cup) 134 | 120
 Rena (Local Cup) 139 | 120
 Trondheim (World Cup) 138 | 124
 Våler (Continental Ladies Cup) 95 | 90

Poland
 Lubawka 94 | 85
 Karpacz 94 | 85
 Szczyrk 104 | 95
 Zakopane 105 | 95
 Wisła (World Cup) 134 | 120
 Zakopane (World Cup) 140 | 125

Romania
 Râșnov Ski Jump (2013 European Youth Olympic Winter Festival, Ladies world cup) K90 | K64 | K35 | K15

Russia
 Tchaikowski (Continental Cup, Ladies world cup) 140 | 125
 Nizhny Tagil (World Cup, Continental Cup) 134 | 120
 Sochi (2014 Winter Olympics) 140 | 125

Slovakia 
 MS 1970 in Štrbské Pleso 125 | 120, 100 | 90

Slovenia

Over 150 
 Planica (World Cup) 240 | 200

100-150 
 Planica (World Cup) 138 | 125, 106 | 95, 104 | 95, 80 | 72, 62 | 56
 Kranj (Continental Cup) 109 | 100
 Ljubno ob Savinji (World Cup) 100 | 90
 Mislinja 93 | 85
 Velenje 94 | 85
 Mostec, Ljubljana 62 | 55

South Korea 
 Muju (constructed for the 1997 Universiade) jury length 133 | K 120
 Pyeongchang (2018 Olympics, World Cup)142 | K 125

Sweden 
 Falun (Continental Cup , World cup) 134 | 120
 Gällivare (SM) 99 | 90
 Örnsköldsvik (SM) 100 | 90
 Sollefteå (Junior WCH 2003) 120 | 107

Switzerland
 Einsiedeln (Continental Cup) 117 | 105
 Engelberg (World Cup) 140 | 125
 Kandersteg Normal hill

Turkey 
 Kiremitliktepe Ski Jump (2011 Universiade) K125 | K95 | K65 | K40 | K20

United States 

 Bush Lake Ski Jump, Bloomington, Minnesota K8 | K18 | K28 | K70
 Harris Hill Ski Jump, Brattleboro, Vermont K90
 Pine Mountain Jump, Iron Mountain, Michigan (Continental Cup, World cup ) 133 | 120
 Copper Peak, Ironwood, Michigan (first ever ski flying hill in the western hemisphere, currently being updated) K 160
 Lake Placid, New York (Continental Cup) 134 | 120
 Utah Olympic Park, Park City, Utah (World Cup) 134 | 120
 Steamboat Springs, Colorado (Continental Cup) 127 | 114
 Snowflake Ski Jump, Westby, Wisconsin (Four Hills SuperTour) 118 | 106
 Silvermine Ski Jump, Eau Claire, Wisconsin

Abandoned
 Papoose Peak Jumps, Squaw Valley, California (Site of 1960 Winter Olympics) 80 | 60 | 40
 Bakke Hill, Leavenworth, Washington (Site of United States Ski Jumping Championships in 1955, 1959, 1967, 1974 and 1978)

See also 
 List of Olympic venues in ski jumping

References

Ski jumping hills
Hills
Hills
Jumping hills
Ski jump